In abstract algebra, the center of a group, is the set of elements that commute with every element of . It is denoted , from German Zentrum, meaning center. In set-builder notation,

.

The center is a normal subgroup, .  As a subgroup, it is always characteristic, but is not necessarily fully characteristic.  The quotient group, is isomorphic to the inner automorphism group, .

A group  is abelian if and only if .  At the other extreme, a group is said to be centerless if  is trivial; i.e., consists only of the identity element.

The elements of the center are sometimes called central.

As a subgroup
In particular:

Since all elements of  commute, it is closed under conjugation.

Note that a homomorphism  between groups generally does not restrict to a homomorphism between their centers. Put another way, there is no "center" functor between categories Grp and Ab. Even though we can map objects, we cannot map arrows.

Conjugacy classes and centralizers
By definition, the center is the set of elements for which the conjugacy class of each element is the element itself; i.e., .

As centralizers are subgroups, this again shows that the center is a subgroup.

Conjugation
.

By the first isomorphism theorem we get,
.

The cokernel of this map is the group  of outer automorphisms, and these form the exact sequence
.

Examples

 The center of the Heisenberg group, is the set of matrices of the form: 
 The center of a nonabelian simple group is trivial.
 The center of the dihedral group, is trivial for odd .  For even , the center consists of the identity element together with the 180° rotation of the polygon.
 The center of the special orthogonal group,  is the whole group when , and otherwise  when n is even, and trivial when n is odd.
 The center of the multiplicative group of non-zero quaternions is the multiplicative group of non-zero real numbers.
 Using the class equation, one can prove that the center of any non-trivial finite p-group is non-trivial.
 If the quotient group  is cyclic,  is abelian (and hence , so  is trivial).
 The center of the megaminx group is a cyclic group of order 2, and the center of the kilominx group is trivial.

Higher centers
Quotienting out by the center of a group yields a sequence of groups called the upper central series:

Concretely, the -st center are the terms that commute with all elements up to an element of the th center. Following this definition, one can define the 0th center of a group to be the identity subgroup. This can be continued to transfinite ordinals by transfinite induction; the union of all the higher centers is called the hypercenter.

The ascending chain of subgroups

stabilizes at i (equivalently) if and only if  is centerless.

Examples
 For a centerless group, all higher centers are zero, which is the case  of stabilization.
 By Grün's lemma, the quotient of a perfect group by its center is centerless, hence all higher centers equal the center.

See also
Center (algebra)
Center (ring theory)
Centralizer and normalizer
Conjugacy class

Notes

References

External links
 

Group theory
Functional subgroups